The Consulate General of the Republic of Poland in Chicago is a consular mission of the Republic of Poland in the United States. The mission serves the largest Polish communities outside of Poland.

The consulate is located at 1530 North Lake Shore Drive in the Gold Coast area of the Near North Side region of Chicago, Illinois.

History
Soon after the establishment of the Second Polish Republic, a consulate was opened in Chicago on June 1, 1920, with  being the first consul. After the United States recognized the Provisional Government of National Unity (later becoming the communist Polish People's Republic) over the Polish government-in-exile in 1945, the previous representatives refused to hand over the premises of their missions, resulting in it taking several months before all consulates, including the one in Chicago, were taken by PPR diplomats. The US Department of State asked that the consulate be closed down in 1954; it took until October 1958 for an agreement to be made to restore it, with the consulate finally reopening in October 1959. The consulate had jurisdiction over 28 states from that point until the opening of a consulate in Los Angeles, which took jurisdiction over 15 western states previously managed there. Through the 1980s, the Polish American Congress held demonstrations outside the consulate, among other measures, to signal their support for the Solidarity movement and protest the imposition of martial law in Poland. This led to the square outside the consulate being dubbed "Solidarity Square".

The building that currently houses the consulate opened in 1916 as a private residence named Eckhart Mansion. The Polish government bought the house in 1974. The house became a Gold Coast historical monument in 1989.

See also
Poland – United States relations
List of diplomatic missions of Poland
Foreign relations of Poland
Polish nationality law

References

External links
 Consulate General of the Republic of Poland in Chicago 

Poland
Chicago
Poland–United States relations